Zafindrafady is a rural municipality in Madagascar. It belongs to the district of Vohipeno, which is a part of the region of Fitovinany. The population of the municipality was 8.395 in 2018.

Its seat is in Ambodimanga.

References 
[mapcarta.com/N8862066958 Mapcarta.com]

Populated places in Fitovinany